Gerald T. Bartlett (born January 7, 1936) is a retired lieutenant general in the United States Army. He was Commandant of the United States Army Command and General Staff College from June 10, 1986 to July 13, 1988. He later retired as  deputy commanding general of the United States Training and Doctrine Command.

References

1936 births
United States Army generals
Living people